An estate in land is, in the law of England and Wales, an interest in real property that is or may become possessory. It is a type of personal property and encompasses land ownership, rental and other arrangements that give people the right to use land. This is distinct from sovereignty over the land, which includes the right to government and taxation.

This should be distinguished from an "estate" as used in reference to an area of land, and "estate" as used to refer to property in general.

In property law, the rights and interests associated with an estate in land may be conceptually understood as a "bundle of rights" because of the potential for different parties having different interests in the same real property.

Categories of estates 
Estates in land can be divided into four basic categories:
 Freehold estates: rights of conveyable exclusive possession and use, having immobility and indeterminate duration
 fee simple 
 fee simple absolute—most rights, least limitations, indefeasible
 defeasible estate—voidable possession and use
 fee simple determinable
 fee simple subject to a condition subsequent
 fee simple subject to executory limitation
 finite estate—limited to lifetimes
 life estate—fragmented possession and use for duration of someone's life
 fee tail—inalienable rights of inheritance for duration of family line
 Leasehold estates: rights of possession and use but not ownership.  The lessor (owner/landlord) gives this right to the lessee (tenant).  There are four categories of leasehold estates:
 estate for years (a term of year absolute or tenancy for years)—lease of any length with specific begin and end date
 periodic estate (periodic tenancy)—automatically renewing lease (month to month, week to week)
 estate at will (tenancy at will)—leasehold for no fixed time or period.  It lasts as long as both parties desire.  Termination is bilateral (either party may terminate at any time) or by operation of law. 
 tenancy at sufferance—created when tenant remains after lease expires and becomes a holdover tenant, converts to holdover tenancy upon landlord acceptance.
Types of leases:
 gross lease
 net lease
 percentage lease
 Concurrent estates: owned or possessed by two or more individuals simultaneously.
 tenancy by the entirety
 joint tenancy
 tenancy in common
 statutory estates: created by law
 community property
 homestead — protection from claim by creditors
 dower—interest a wife has in the property of her husband
 curtesy—interest a husband has in the property of his wife
 Equitable estates: neither ownership nor possession
 Future interests — interests in real or personal property, a gift or trust, or other things in which the privilege of possession or of enjoyment is in the future and not the present
 reversions
 possibilities of reverter
 powers of termination, also known as rights of reentry for condition broken
 remainders
 executory interests
 Incorporeal interests — those that cannot be possessed physically, since they consist of rights of a particular user, or the right to enforce an agreement concerning use
 easement
 easement in gross
 easement appurtenant
 ingress
 egress
 profits a prendre
 real covenants
 covenant appurtenant
 covenant in gross
 equitable servitudes
 licenses
 Lien
 general
 specific

References

Real property law